The Journal of Near Infrared Spectroscopy is a bimonthly peer-reviewed scientific journal published by SAGE Publishing in partnership with Optica. It was established in 1993 and covers near-infrared spectroscopy and its applications, with subtopics including chemometrics, chemical imaging, fiber optics, instrumentation and diffuse reflection. Its editor-in-chief is Roger Meder.

Abstracting and indexing
The journal is abstracted and indexed in :
Chemical Abstracts
Current Contents/Engineering, Computing & Technology
Inspec
Science Citation Index Expanded
Scopus
According to the Journal Citation Reports, the journal has a 2021 impact factor of 1.576.

References

External links

English-language journals
Publications established in 1993
Bimonthly journals
Optics journals
SAGE Publishing academic journals
Optica (society) academic journals